

Nobel laureates
Har Gobind Khorana

Rulers
Maharaja Ranjit Singh was a founder of a Sikh Empire
Porus the Elder was an ancient Indian King
Banda Singh Bahadur was an commander of Khalsa army
Nawab Kapur Singh was the organizer of the Sikh Confederacy and the Dal Khalsa.
Jassa Singh Ahluwalia, Sikh leader during the  Sikh Confederacy, being the Supreme Leader of the Dal Khalsa. He was also Misldar of the Ahluwalia Misl from approximately 1716 to 1801. He founded the Kapurthala State in 1772
Charat Singh, the father of Mahan Singh, and grandfather of Ranjit Singh. He distinguished himself in campaigns against Ahmad Shah Abdali and split from the Singhpuria Misl to establish the Sukerchakia Misl.
Maha Singh, the eldest son of Charat Singh and Desan Kaur, who became the second chief of the Sukerchakia Misl on the death of his father. His son Ranjit Singh succeeded him and established the Sikh Empire. He is known for his alliance with Jassa Singh Ramgarhia and for reducing the power of the Kanhaiya Misl
Jassa Singh Ramgarhia was a prominent Sikh leader during the period of the Sikh Confederacy. He was the Commander of the Ramgarhia Misl

Other Notable Misl Rulers 
Jai Singh Kanhaiya was the founder of Kanhaiya Misl, he was one of the most powerful sikh rulers during Sikh Confederacies period
Sada Kaur Mother-in-law of  Ranjit Singh. She served as a chief of the Kanhaiya Misl from 1789 to 1821
Hari Singh Dhillon one of the most powerful, admired in all the sikhs in 18th century. He was the Maharaja of Amritsar and Lahore and large area of central and western part of Punjab
Baghel Singh was the chief of Singh Krora Misl

Mughal Governors
Abd al-Samad Khan
Zakariya Khan Bahadur
Adina Beg
Wazir Khan (Sirhind)
Moin-ul-Mulk

Military leaders

Indian Armed Forces

Air Force
 Marshal of the Indian Air Force Arjan Singh, former Chief of Indian Air Force, the only living Indian military officer with a five-star rank.

 Air Chief Marshal Om Prakash Mehra, former Chief of Indian Air Force
 Air Chief Marshal Dilbagh Singh, former Chief of the Indian Air Force

Army
 General Bikram Singh, former Indian Army chief
 General J. J. Singh, former Indian Army Chief
 General Pran Nath Thapar, former Indian Army Chief
 Lieutenant General Jagjit Singh Aurora, General Officer Commanding-in-Chief (GOC-in-C) of the Eastern Command of the Indian Army during the Indo-Pakistani War of 1971.
 Lieutenant General Harbaksh Singh, Western Army Commander and War Hero 1965 Indo-Pak War
 Brigadier Kuldip Singh Chandpuri (retired), known for his heroic leadership in the famous Battle of Longewala for which he was awarded Maha Vir Chakra (MVC) by the Indian Army

Navy
 Admiral Sardarilal Mathradas Nanda
 Admiral Karambir Singh

Military Gallantry Award winners

British Indian Army

Victoria Cross
 Karamjeet Singh Judge, 15th Punjab Regiment
 Gian Singh, Sikh Regiment
 Ishar Singh, 28th Punjabis; first Sikh to receive Victoria Cross
 Nand Singh, 1/11th Sikh Regiment
 Parkash Singh, Sikh Regiment
 Sher Shah, 16th Punjab Regiment

Indian Armed Forces

Param Veer Chakra (PVC)
 Subedar Joginder Singh Sahnan, Sikh Regiment 
 Gurbachan Singh Salaria, 1 Gorkha Rifles
 Nirmal Jit Singh Sekhon, Indian Air Force 
 Lance Naik Karam Singh, Sikh Regiment

Maha Veer Chakra (MVC)
 Brigadier Kuldip Singh Chandpuri, known for his heroic leadership in the famous Battle of Longewala
 Ranjit Singh Dyal, Indian Army general and an administrator
 Wing Commander Jag Mohan Nath, officer in Indian Air Force
 Major General Kulwant Singh Pannu, officer of Indian Army
 Lieutenant Colonel Dewan Ranjit Rai, senior Indian Army officer
 General Tapishwar Narain Raina, former Chief of the Army Staff of Indian Army
 Nand Singh, also an Indian recipient of Victoria Cross
 Sukhjit Singh
 Major General Rajinder Singh Sparrow, Armoured Corps

Business 

 Trishneet Arora
 Sabeer Bhatia, co-founder of Hotmail
 Gurbaksh Chahal
 Naresh Goyal, of Jet Airways
 Sunil Mittal, Chairman and managing director of the Bharti group
 Aroon Purie, India Today group
 Kanwal Rekhi, one of the first Indian entrepreneurs in Silicon Valley

Artists
 Manjit Bawa
 Sarindar Dhaliwal
 Satish Gujral
 Sobha Singh

Educators and scientists
 Megh R. Goyal, father of irrigation engineering in Puerto Rico
 Narinder Singh Kapany

Astronauts 
 Air Commodore Ravish Malhotra
 Rakesh Sharma, first Indian in space

Punjabi Cinema

Punjabi Actors
Diljit Dosanjh
Gurpreet Ghuggi
Amrinder Gill
Gugu Gill
Gippy Grewal
Gurdas Maan
Yograj Singh
Jimmy Sheirgill
Ammy Virk
Sidhu Moose Wala

Punjabi Actress
Sargun Mehta
Mandy Takhar
Sonam Bajwa
Neeru Bajwa
Himanshi Khurana
Shehnaaz Gill

Bollywood

Families

The Anands
 Chetan Anand
 Dev Anand
 Vijay Anand
 Shekhar Kapur

The Chopras
 Baldev Raj Chopra
 Yash Chopra
 Ravi Chopra

The Deols
 Dharmendra
 Sunny Deol

The Devgans
 Veeru Devgan
 Anil Devgan

The Dutts
 Sunil Dutt
 Sanjay Dutt

The Oberois
 Suresh Oberoi
 Vivek Oberoi

The Paintals
 Paintal
 Gufi Paintal

The Puris
 Madan Puri
 Amrish Puri

The Sahnis
 Balraj Sahni
 Bhisham Sahni
 Parikshit Sahni

Individual artists

 Amrish Puri
 Anand Bakshi
 Akshay Kumar
 Bina Rai
Diljit Dosanjh
 David Dhawan
 Deepti Naval
 Dara Singh
 Divya Dutta
 Geeta Bali
 Gul Panag
 Honey Singh
 I. S. Johar
 Jeetendra (Ravi Kapoor)
 Jimmy Shergill
 Kapil Sharma
 Kamini Kaushal
 Kulbhushan Kharbanda
 Kirron Kher
 Mangal Dhillon
 Mukesh Khanna
 Mandira Bedi
 Monica Bedi
 Mohammed Rafi
 Neha Dhupia
 Navin Nischol
 Om Prakash
 Pankaj Kapur
 Poonam Dhillon
 Prem Chopra
 Parmeet Sethi
 Pooja Batra
 Pooja Bedi
 Ruby Bhatia
 Ranjeet
 Raj Babbar
 Rajendra Kumar
 Rati Agnihotri
 Raveena Tandon
 Rajat Kapoor
 Rajesh Khanna
 Ranbir Pushp
 Rahul Roy
 Rajit Kapur
 Roshan
 Rubina Shergill
 Simone Singh
 Suraiya
 Simi Garewal
 Saeed Jaffrey
 Vinod Khanna
 Vinod Mehra
 Vicky Kaushal

Documentary filmmakers
 Jaspal Bhatti

Directors
 Harry Baweja
 Yash Chopra
 David Dhawan

Crossover directors and actors (Hollywood)
 Waris Ahluwalia
 Art Malik
 Deepa Mehta

History 

 Charaka

Folklore

 Puran Bhagat

Religious and spiritual figures

The Ten Gurus of Sikhism

 Guru Nanak
 Guru Angad
 Guru Amar Das
 Guru Ram Das
 Guru Arjan Dev
 Guru Hargobind
 Guru Har Rai
 Guru Har Krishan
 Guru Teg Bahadur
 Guru Gobind Singh
 Guru Granth Sahib

Sikh
 Harbhajan Singh Yogi
 Giani Sant Singh Maskeen

Related to Sikhism
 Sri Chand, son of Guru Nanak Dev

Radha Soami Satsang Beas
 Baba Jaimal Singh
 Baba Sawan Singh
 Sardar Bahadur Maharaj Jagat Singh
 Maharaj Charan Singh
 Baba Gurinder Singh

Ahmidiyya Muslim Community 
Mirzā Ghulām Ahmad
Mirza Basheer-ud-Din Mahmood Ahmad
Mirza Nasir Ahmad
Mirza Tahir Ahmad

Writers

Punjabi, Hindi and Urdu 

 Bhai Gurdas
 Giani Gurdit Singh
 Shardha Ram Phillauri
 Nanak Singh
 Dhani Ram Chatrik
 Bhai Kahn Singh Nabha
 Bhai Vir Singh
 Rajinder Singh Bedi
 Shiv Kumar Batalvi
 Damodar Das Arora
 Sahir Ludhianvi
 Amrita Pritam
 Gulzar (full name Sampooran Singh Gulzar), Oscar winner for movie Slumdog Millionaire
 Jaswant Neki
 Pash
 Rupinderpal Singh Dhillon
 Harbhajan Singh
 Munir Niazi
 Ajmer Rode
 Navtej Bharati
 Jaswant Singh Kanwal
 Hafeez Jullundhri
 Saadat Hasan Manto
 Mehr Lal Soni Zia Fatehabadi
 Kulwant Singh Virk

English

 Khushwant Singh
 Vikram Chandra
 Kartar Singh Duggal
 Amrita Pritam
 Partap Sharma
 Susham Bedi
 Ahmed Rashid
 Vidya Dhar Mahajan

Journalists

Print

India
 Kuldip Nayar
 Arun Shourie
 Aroon Purie
 Tarun Tejpal
 Prabhu Chawla
 Tavleen Singh

Tamil cinema
 Sonia Agarwal, Punjabi Hindu

Models
 Waris Ahluwalia, American model, endorses the clothing brand GAP

Musicians

Punjabi Folk and Classical Music

 Sardool Sikander
 Kamal Heer 
 Gurdas Maan 
 Kuldeep Manak
 Yamla Jatt
 Amar Singh Chamkila

Punjabi Pop and Hip Hop

Sidhu Moose Wala
Diljit Dosanjh
Karan Aujla
Amrinder Gill
Guru Randhawa
Yo Yo Honey Singh
Jassi Gill

Bollywood
 Sardool Sikander
 Suraiya
 Shamshad Begum
 Mohammed Rafi
 OP Nayyar
 Mahendra Kapoor
 Madan Mohan
 Sukhwinder Singh
 Diljit Dosanjh
 Kamal Khan, Bollywood playback singer

 Jaspinder Narula
 Jyotica Tangri
 Yo Yo Honey Singh
 Guru Randhawa
 Khushboo Grewal

Bhangra and other Punjabi people

 Jagmeet Bal
 Asa Singh Mastana
 Surinder Shinda
 Surinder Kaur
 Malkit Singh
 Manmohan Waris
 Kamal Heer
 Daler Mehndi
 Surjit Bindrakhia
 Babbu Mann
 Balkar Sidhu
 Lehmber Hussainpuri
 Hans Raj Hans
 Sukhwinder Singh
 Jaspinder Narula
 Kulwinder Dhillon
 Bombay Rockers
 Harshdeep Kaur
 Sukhbir
 Labh Janjua
 Sukhshinder Shinda
 Bally Sagoo
 Apache Indian
 Channi Singh
 Panjabi MC
 Jay Sean
 Hard Kaur
 Rishi Rich
 Juggy D
 Taz
 Harbhajan Mann
 Jazzy B
 Miss Pooja

Revolutionaries and Freedom Fighters
 
 
 Prithvi Singh Azad, Indian independence activist, revolutionary and one of the founder members of Ghadar Party
 Bhai Balmukund was an Indian revolutionary freedom fighter
 Sohan Singh Bhakna, was an Indian revolutionary, the founding president of the Ghadar Party
 Amir Chand Bombwal
 Diwan Mulraj Chopra
 Satyapal Dang
 Jathedar Bhai Tehal Singh Dhanju, Indian Freedom Fighter, Sikh leader and activist; planned The Lahore Conspiracies
 Madan Lal Dhingra, was an Indian revolutionary independence activist
 Kishan Singh Gargaj, Indian Freedom Fighter and Founder of militant Babbar Akali Movement against British rule
 Sadhu Singh Hamdard, well-known freedom fighter and the journalist of Punjab
 Dharam Singh Hayatpur, was an Indian revolutionary, he was a prominent member of the Sikh political and religious group the Babbar Akali Movement in India
 Kartar Singh Jhabbar, was an Indian revolutionary, he was a Sikh leader known for his role in the Gurdwara Reform Movement of the 1920s
 Sohan Singh Josh, was an Indian communist activist and freedom fighter
 Gulab Kaur
 Sardul Singh Kavishar
 Saifuddin Kitchlew
 Sunder Singh Lyallpuri, was a General of Akali Movement
 Mangu Ram Mugowalia, Indian freedom fighter, politician from Punjab and one of the founder members of the Ghadar Party
 Bhai Parmanand
 Darshan Singh Pheruman, Indian freedom fighter, Sikh activist and politician
 Jaswant Singh Rahi
 Lala Lajpat Rai, Indian Freedom Fighter, popularly known as Punjab Kesari
 Ram Rakha
 Lala Achint Ram
 Harnam Singh Saini
 Labh Singh Saini,  Akali politician and notable Indian freedom fighter
 Maya Singh Saini, was a soldier in the Sikh Khalsa Army during the Anglo-Sikh Wars and continued fighting British Rule after the Second war
 Teja Singh Samundri
 Kartar Singh Sarabha, Indian Independence activist and a Ghadr revolutionary
 Baba Gurdit Singh
 Baba Gurmukh Singh, Indian Freedom Fighter, a Ghadr revolutionary and a Sikh activist
 Baba Kharak Singh
 Baldev Singh, was an Indian independence movement leader and also the first Defence Minister of India
 Bhagat Singh, Indian Freedom Fighter and most common symbol of India's Freedom Struggle by any means and a Ghadr revolutionary
 Captain Mohan Singh, was an Indian military officer and also an Indian Independence Activist
 Ganda Singh, was a prominent member of the Ghadar Party
 Giani Ditt Singh
 Pandit Kanshi Ram, Was an Indian Revolutionary and Treasurer Of Ghadar Party
 Ram Singh, credited as being the first Indian to use non-cooperation and boycott of British merchandise and services as a political weapon.
 Ripudaman Singh, Indian revolutionary
 Sardar Ajit Singh, was an Indian revolutionary, he was the uncle of sardar Bhagat Singh and an alleged assassin for the Ghadar Party
 Udham Singh, Indian Revolutionary
 Teja Singh Swatantar
 Sukhdev Thapar, was an Indian Revolutionary
 Bhagwati Charan Vohra, was an Indian revolutionary, associated with Hindustan Socialist Republican Association

Politicians

India
 Amarinder Singh
 Baldev Singh
 Bibi Jagir Kaur
 Buta Singh
 Darbara Singh
 Giani Zail Singh
 Gulzari Lal Nanda
 Gurcharan Singh Tohra
 Gurdial Singh Dhillon
 Harkishan Singh Surjeet
 Inder Kumar Gujral
 Krishan Kant
 Madanlal Khurana
 Malik Umar Hayat Khan
 Manmohan Singh
 Master Tara Singh
 Parkash Singh Badal
 Pratap Singh Kairon
 Rajinder Kaur Bhattal
 Sant Fateh Singh
 Sardul Singh Caveeshar
 Simranjit Singh Mann
 Surjit Singh Barnala
 Swaran Singh
 Laxmi Kanta Chawla
 Chaudhary Nand Lal
 Charanjit Singh Channi
Sukhjinder Singh Randhawa
Amrinder Singh Raja Warring
Partap Singh Bajwa

Sportspersons

Cricket

 Yadavendra Singh
 Lala Amarnath
 Mohinder Amarnath
 Bishan Singh Bedi
 Bhupinder Singh snr
 Gursharan Singh
 Yograj Singh
 Amarjit Kaypee
 Maninder Singh
 Rajinder Ghai
 Navjot Singh Sidhu
 Chetan Sharma
 Madan Lal
 Dinesh Mongia
 Harbhajan Singh
 Yuvraj Singh
 V. R. V. Singh
 Reetinder Sodhi
 Sunny Sohal

Hockey

Field hockey
 Ajitpal Singh
 Balbir Singh Sr.
 Prithipal Singh
 Baljeet Singh Saini
 Gagan Ajit Singh
 Prabhjot Singh
 Ramandeep Singh
 Baljit Singh Dhillon
 Deepak Thakur
 Surjit Singh Randhawa

Athletics
 Milkha Singh
 Ajmer Singh (1940–2010), Olympian and 1966 Jakarta Asian Games gold medallist sprinter
 Kamaljeet Sandhu
 Baljinder Singh (born 1986), race walker
 Inderjeet Singh, shot put athlete

Golf
 Jeev Milkha Singh
 Gaganjeet Bhullar

Wrestling

 The Great Gama
 Dara Singh
 Jinder Mahal
 Premchand Degra
 Tiger Jeet Singh
 Gurjit Singh
 Sonjay Dutt (real name Ritesh Bhalla), TNA wrestler

Fighters
 Akshay Kumar, real name Rajeev Bhatia, black belt in karate; film actor 
 Veeru Devgan, father of Ajay Devgan, action and stunt designer

Shooting
 Avneet Sidhu, Commonwealth Games medalist, Arjun Award recipient
 Harveen Srao, 2011 Summer Universiade medalist in 10m air pistol

Basketball
 Satnam Singh Bhamara, drafted by the Dallas Mavericks with the 52nd pick in the 2015 NBA draft, making him the first person of Indian descent to be drafted into the NBA
Sports Executives and Administrators

 Shammi Rana

See also
 List of Sikhs
List of British Sikhs
List of British Punjabis

References